Outside is the third album from the Minneapolis-based band Tapes 'n Tapes, released on January 11, 2011.

Track listing
All songs written by Josh Grier.
"Badaboom"
"SWM"
"One in the World"
"Nightfall"
"Desert Plane"
"Outro"
"Freak Out"
"The Saddest of All Keys"
"Hidee Ho"
"People You Know"
"On and On"
"Mighty Long"

Band members
Josh Grier – guitar, vocals
Jeremy Hanson – drums
Matt Kretzman – keyboards, multi-instruments
Erik Appelwick – bass guitar

References 

Tapes 'n Tapes albums
2011 albums